Charles George Perceval, 2nd Baron Arden PC FRS (1 October 1756 – 5 July 1840) was a British politician.

Background and education

Charles George Perceval was born at Charlton, Kent, the son of John Perceval, 2nd Earl of Egmont, by his second wife Catherine, 1st Baroness Arden, daughter of Charles Compton. Prime Minister Spencer Perceval was his younger brother. 

He was educated at Harrow and Trinity College, Cambridge.

Political career
Arden sat as Member of Parliament for Launceston from 1780 to 1790, for Warwick from 1790 to 1796 and for Totnes from 1796 to 1802. He had succeeded his mother as second Baron Arden in 1784. However, as this was an Irish peerage it did not prevent him sitting in the House of Commons.

He served as Master of the Mint between 1801 and 1802 and as a Commissioner of the India Board between 1801 and 1803. In 1801 he was admitted to the Privy Council.  In 1802 he was created Baron Arden, of Arden in the County of Warwick, in the Peerage of the United Kingdom, and was then obliged to enter the upper chamber of parliament. He was also a Lord of the Bedchamber between 1804 and 1812, a Registrar of the Court of Admiralty between 1790 and 1840 and served as Lord Lieutenant of Surrey between 1830 and 1840.

Family
Lord Arden married Margaretta Elizabeth, daughter of General Sir Thomas Spencer Wilson, 6th Baronet, in 1787. They had six sons and two daughters. He died at St James's Place, London, in July 1840, aged 83, and was succeeded by his third but eldest surviving son, George, who also succeeded in the earldom of Egmont the following year. Lady Arden died in May 1851, aged 83.

References

External links

1756 births
1840 deaths
People educated at Harrow School
Alumni of Trinity College, Cambridge
Barons in the Peerage of Ireland
1
Perceval, Charles
British MPs 1784–1790
British MPs 1790–1796
British MPs 1796–1800
Lord-Lieutenants of Surrey
UK MPs 1801–1802
UK MPs who inherited peerages
UK MPs who were granted peerages
Perceval, Charles
Eldest sons of British hereditary barons
Masters of the Mint
Members of the Privy Council of the United Kingdom
Fellows of the Royal Society
Members of the Parliament of Great Britain for constituencies in Cornwall
Members of the Parliament of Great Britain for Totnes
Members of the Parliament of the United Kingdom for Totnes
Lords of the Admiralty